This article lists events from the year 2018 in Syria.

Incumbents
 President: Bashar al-Assad
 Prime Minister: Imad Khamis

Events
For events related to the Civil War, see Timeline of the Syrian Civil War (January–April 2018), Timeline of the Syrian Civil War (May–August 2018) and Timeline of the Syrian Civil War (September–December 2018)

Deaths

4 April – Ignatius Peter VIII Abdalahad, Syriac Catholic prelate (b. 1930).

6 July – Omran al-Zoubi, politician (b. 1959).

21 August – Hanna Mina, novelist (b. 1924).

8 October – Dina Haroun, actress (Maraya) (b. 1973).

23 November – Raed Fares, anti-government activist (b. 1972).

References

 
2010s in Syria 
Years of the 21st century in Syria 
Syria 
Syria